Troglohyphantes nigraerosae is a species of cave spider of the family Linyphiidae. It is endemic to Italy.

Morphology 
Troglohyphantes nigraerosae is a small sized cave spider with a body length of 3 mm (Prosoma length: 1.50 mm,  prosoma width: 1.15 mm).  From a genetic standpoint, T. nigrerosae represent the sister group of T. vignai. Males of the latter species can be distinguished from T. nigraerosae by the shape of the lamella significativa of the male palp (see ).

Distribution 
Southern Graian Alps (NW Italy). The species occurs preferentially in caves.

References 

Linyphiidae
Spiders of Europe
Spiders described in 1971